Pilar Lopez-Fitzgerald is a fictional character on the NBC/DirecTV soap opera Passions.  Pilar was played by Eva Tamargo during the entire run of the show.

Character history

Early life
Pilar is the matriarch of the Lopez-Fitzgerald family. She had been born in Mexico, but had moved to Harmony in her twenties as the wife of Martin Fitzgerald, whom she had married when she was 18. She had immediately gotten a job working for the wealthy Winthrop family, becoming Ivy Winthrop's personal maid when Ivy was only a small child. When Ivy had married Julian Crane, Pilar had gone with her to the Crane household.

Martin had disappeared shortly after Pilar had given birth to their youngest daughter, Paloma Lopez-Fitzgerald, leaving her with five children under age 10. Pilar had immediately sent Paloma to Mexico to live with and be raised by her sister Maria, leaving grade-school-aged Antonio in charge of toddlers Theresa and Miguel. At the same time, the young family had also been kicked out of their home on the Crane grounds. Pilar had refused to leave Ivy and because the Cranes paid poorly, she had worked two jobs to support her family, leaving young Antonio to care for his younger brothers and sister. This had continued for the next dozen years until Antonio had disappeared shortly after Luis graduated high school, at which point Luis had become a police officer and Pilar had been able to quit her second job.

Early years
Although Pilar had always been loyal to Ivy (including keeping the secret of the paternity of her son, Ethan Crane), her first loyalty is to her family. As the series begins in 1999, Pilar discovers that Theresa is obsessively pursuing Ethan, despite the fact he was in a relationship with Gwen Hotchkiss, but Pilar does nothing to stop her daughter. In 2000 Pilar takes preventative methods when she learns that Theresa had accidentally come across the papers that proved that Ethan was Sam Bennett's son and not Julian Crane's. Pilar forces Theresa to lie to Ivy and Ethan. With the secret about Ethan is finally out in the open in 2001 when Gwen and her mother frame Theresa for exposing it, Pilar tries hard to keep Ivy from interfering in Sam and Grace Bennett's marriage. In 2002, as Ethan and Theresa are about to marry, Ivy intends to tell her son that Theresa had accidentally wed Julian and had then believed that she was having his child. To protect the secret, both Pilar and Theresa attack a wheelchair-using Ivy, leaving her locked in her room without any means of escape so that Theresa can marry Ethan without interference. Ivy manages tell Ethan the truth anyway.

Martin returns
The family are evicted from their home in 2004, and Pilar becomes very ill, eventually being hospitalized. A mystery cure seems to be helping her, but after she learns of Antonio's death, she relapses. Pilar seems to finally be cured, and then Martin returns to town. Initially Pilar is overjoyed, but upset to learn of Martin's longtime affair with Alistair Crane's former wife, Katherine, with whom Martin had left town.  By 2005, Pilar is not willing to let her husband go, and is determined to get him back. She even aligns herself with the evil Alistair, but is unable to use the information that he gives her to force Martin to be with her. Martin finally confesses to Pilar why he had left town, and Pilar admits that she knows about Alistair beating and raping Katherine, and about Martin helping Alistair cover up Sheridan's murder of her aunt, Rachel Barrett. Martin and Pilar begin planning for their life together in 2006, and things only seem to get better when they discover that Rachel is alive after all. Martin and Pilar move forward with their future, planning an elaborate vow renewal. Unfortunately, Pilar discovers Martin and Katherine together just hours before the ceremony and tells Martin to get out of her life, even though he swears that she is the only one that he wants. Six months later, she files for divorce.

Pilar's secret 
In March 2007, the Blackmailer terrorizes everyone in Harmony by threatening to expose their darkest secrets, originally collected by tabloid reporter J.T. Cornell. It is revealed that Pilar herself has a "horrible" secret of which her entire family is unaware; Gwen soon finds out, and uses it against her. Divorced from Ethan but wanting him back, Gwen pressures Pilar to convince Theresa to stay away from Ethan, and to keep the secret from Ethan that Theresa's son Little Ethan is actually Ethan's. Pilar hints that the exposure of her secret will guarantee her children's deaths. On November 12, 2007, Gwen tells her mother Rebecca Hotchkiss that she just wants to keep Ethan and Theresa apart, not reveal Pilar's secret; Rebecca, however - no fan of Pilar or Theresa - has already told the mysterious "white-haired woman" hunting Pilar that the Lopez-Fitzgerald family is in New England.

On November 21, 2007 Pilar's secret is revealed. Pilar and the white-haired woman - Juanita Vasquez - had grown up in Mexico as close friends. As young girls, Pilar and Juanita had spoken of wanting to find love and have their own family one day, however Juanita wanted to have a wealthy husband and was overly obsessed with wanting very high quality luxurious items and a big mansion. Juanita had become engaged to a man named Carlos Alejandro Vasquez, the heir to an immense drug cartel; Pilar had been worried about the Vasquez's involvement with drugs and even warned Juanita to not marry into that family, and although Juanita herself at first was skeptical about marrying into the Vazquez family being aware of their criminal backgrounds, Juanita slowly did not care about this as she was extremely too caught up in wanting a wealthy husband and to live in extreme high luxury and a very big mansion that her judgment was clouded and also had reassured her friend that Carlos supposedly promised he was going to leave the family crime business, and was instead going to become an attorney. Pilar had then married Martin and moved to and settled with her husband in New England, USA and had given birth to Antonio and Luis.

Pilar and Juanita had continued to remain in touch about their lives and families. One time, Juanita had contacted Pilar by letter giving updates about her own life and her family, which she had requested Pilar's sister Maria to forward to Pilar living in United States as Juanita did not know where in the United States Pilar was living in and there was also an invitation to Pilar in the letter to visit Juanita. Although Pilar would go back to Mexico for visits to her relatives from time to time after she immigrated to the United States to settle with her husband Martin, but this time Pilar agreed to Juanita's invitation letter and took a trip down to Mexico to visit Juanita to catch up about their own lives and their families, which at the time they were both young mothers and at first it was believed that Carlos was a lawyer and left the family crime business as Juanita had stated in the letter as well as during Pilar's arrival into Juanita's house. This was taking place sometime in the early 1980s and at the moment, Juanita was shown to be joyously happy and have a bubbly demeanor. However, this would be Pilar's last time taking a trip down to Mexico because later on, during the end of Pilar's visit in Mexico, Pilar had stopped by Juanita's home to want to say goodbye to her before getting ready to go on the airplane to go back home to the United States, but instead as Pilar was about to walk into Juanita's living room, she saw Carlos on a phone conversation in the living room and stopped right on the edge of the entrance to the living room and stood on the other side of the wall overhearing that Carlos had indeed risen to control the Drug cartel as well as ordering a mass murder of another family and had been lying about himself being a lawyer to his wife Juanita all this time as well as Carlos was mocking Juanita about her naive materialistic personality and through this whole marriage has just considered her to be a Trophy wife just making Carlos look respected. Pilar attempted to leave the house to find Juanita and warn her, but Carlos had already saw her standing on the other side of the wall right at the edge of the entrance to the living room with half her back body being exposed eavesdropping on him as Pilar was not smart enough to keep herself completely hidden away on the other side of the wall to avoid being seen. Carlos caught her and began talking to her and Pilar confronted him about his deceit to his wife Juanita and lying to her, but Carlos carelessly attempted to seduce Pilar into becoming his secret lover and even commented that one more deceit would not matter including attempting to kiss Pilar, which Pilar resisted and smacked Carlos threatening to call the police, however Carlos enraged knocks Pilar down and other items onto the ground threatening that her husband will become a widower if she calls the police and despite Pilar attempting to crawl to escape and scream for help, Carlos overpowers her knocking her unconsciously and viciously raped Pilar; and when she woke up, she in turn had struck him with a candlestick in self-defense and killed him accidentally. Pilar had then called the police and told them about the cartel.

Later on, Juanita arrived home from her free spirited carefree shopping spree and at first she noticed Pilar sitting on the sofa with bruises and even showed concern to Pilar asking her what happened, however Pilar had only said that something awful happened and then Juanita turned around seeing Carlos' body lying on the floor. At first, Juanita thought an intruder came into the house and attacked them both, but then Pilar tried to explain to Juanita the truth about Carlos and how he attacked her, however Juanita did not believe her and would not listen and instead Juanita accused Pilar of purposely murdering her husband and accused Pilar of being a liar. At that moment, the police stormed the Vasquez estate; believing that the entire family had been involved in the drug cartel, the police fired upon Juanita's children and the rest of the family, who had been outside on the terrace, which Juanita witnessed the bloody horrifying event from her living room. They had all been killed. Juanita - the only Vasquez left alive - had been taken into custody because of her relationship with Carlos. Juanita was still sitting in the living room already handcuffed and getting ready to be taken away by the police and although Pilar who was in the living room with her tried to apologize for her family being killed in the massacre and tried to explain she was only trying to stop the drug cartel violence and never wanted any of her family members being killed, Juanita who was mad with grief was not interested in listening to Pilar's explanations nor cared for if it was the truth or not and blamed Pilar for her family's deaths including accusing Pilar of lying about Carlos raping her. Juanita also blamed Pilar for getting her into trouble with the law enforcement and then Pilar tried defending herself reasoning with Juanita that she already had warned her about marrying into the Vasquez family and that it was a bad idea in the first place and that is what got Juanita into trouble with the police, but Juanita would not listen and continued see Pilar as the only blame for her getting into trouble with the authorities and Juanita became even more enraged and hostile warning Pilar she should start running as far away as she can, vowing that when she leaves prison, she will find Pilar and her family and kill them all. Pilar had returned to Harmony while Juanita had been sent to prison. Pilar had subsequently given birth to Theresa, Miguel and Paloma, and had never told of her involvement in the massacre to anyone except for Father Lonigan and Ivy Winthrop. The secret had remained buried for twenty five years. Since then, she never went back to her home country of Mexico again fearing that Juanita would find her and find out where her family lives to exact her deathful revenge against Pilar and her family.

In 2007, Juanita states that after her time in prison, she had discovered her husband's involvement with the cartel and that Pilar was right after all; though at first horrified, Juanita had gradually learned to enjoy the lifestyle as well as learning how to use destructive weapons and self defense fighting techniques and had soon become head of the Drug cartel herself - honoring her husband's memory and murdering anyone who stood in her way. She would become one of Mexico's most cold hearted ruthless powerfully influential criminal leaders as well as she began to develop high enjoyments, pleasures, and an extreme high laughing humor in torturing and killing those that offend her. As Juanita became mentally unstable from the trauma of her whole family suddenly being killed that night, she came into the drug cartel as a way to cope with loss of her family as well as a way to continue to feed into her desires to live luxuriously wealthy; which she began to enjoy the high pleasures of making massive fortunes from the drug cartels.

Although Juanita found out that Pilar was right about Carlos never being a lawyer and never left the drug cartel business and even though she was at first very horrified, her unstable mental state caused her to still have difficulties accepting the real truth about Carlos and then slowly began to develop the belief that it is another way of doing business and making money and a living and that it was a way of supporting her luxurious good lifestyle for her and her family and still did not believe that Carlos raped Pilar, but instead she began to have false delusions that Pilar sexually seduced and killed Carlos. Instead of Juanita realizing her part in making a mistake of marrying into the Vazquez family, which ran a very powerfully influentially dangerous criminal business and that Carlos lied about him leaving the crime family business to become a lawyer is what all led her children to be accidentally caught and killed in the cartel/police violence; including getting herself into trouble with the police enforcement and that Pilar never meant for Juanita's children to be killed in the police/cartel violence, she still continued to only blame Pilar as the only reason for her children being accidentally caught up and mistakenly killed in the police vs. cartel violence because of Pilar's role of calling the police about the cartel; including Juanita getting into trouble with law enforcement. Juanita even stated remembering the grounds, grasses and flowers outside her house being completely stained and soaked by her children's blood from the police shooting. In addition, Juanita began to have delusional thoughts believing that Pilar was jealous of Juanita's luxurious lifestyle and wanted to intentionally destroy her happiness. As a result, she wanted to have the power and the human connections to find Pilar and her family to exact her deadly revenge, which is another reason why Juanita stepped into her husband's role in the drug cartel.

There was one time after Juanita was released from prison, Pilar did make a long-distance call from her house in the US to Juanita's home in Mexico and tried to reason with her that she never meant for Juanita's family to be killed and was begging her for both of them to find a way to get past what happened to Carlos and Juanita's children nonviolently including asking for Juanita's forgiveness, but Juanita did not want to hear of it and swore with rage that she will hunt Pilar and her family down and kill them and there can be no peace between them until Pilar and her family are dead, however Juanita was still never able to track down where Pilar was living in the United States after that for many years until Gwen Hotchkiss and Rebecca Hotchkiss found information about this secret of Pilar's from J.T. Cornell's USB drive, which J.T. had been deeply finding detailed information about lives of the residents of Harmony and then saving it into the USB drive, but J.T. was killed and somehow Rebecca and Gwen managed to get a hold of the USB drive and then Rebecca eventually contacted Juanita about Pilar's whereabouts in late 2007, but due to bad phone connections, Juanita only heard that Pilar was in New England. Eventually and finally getting information on Pilar's whereabouts, Juanita executes her plan of revenge. She first murders Pilar's sister Maria Lopez and her two sons. Juanita lures Pilar and Theresa to Mexico and hunts them down; the boat they are on explodes, and Theresa is presumed dead. She survives, however, but returns to Harmony in secret to protect her family from Juanita's vengeance. Juanita was then listed as a Mexican fugitive and was on the run and managed to sneak her way into the United States with the help of her henchman to search for Pilar.

On August 4, 2008 - the final week of Passions, Juanita Vasquez was finally captured by Sam Bennett, Luis Lopez-Fitzgerald and Miguel Lopez-Fitzgerald. At long last, Juanita finally got what's coming to her, her bomb that she was going to use to kill the Lopez-Fitzgerald family was defused and most of all - Pilar can finally live the rest of her life without living in fear from Juanita. Gwen and Rebecca are exposed for their scheming ways, and brought to jail, leaving Theresa to be with Ethan. Pilar now not only lives without fear, but with the satisfaction that all of her children are happily wed.

Hidden Passions
In the book Hidden Passions, Pilar's grandmother is named Teresa, and she has an Uncle Carlos and Aunt Marta on her father's side.  Information in the book has not been confirmed on-screen and is considered non-canonical since the information seen on the show contradicts some of what is written in the book.

See also
Lopez-Fitzgerald family

References

External links
Pilar Lopez-Fitzgerald profile - SoapCentral.com

Passions characters
Fictional factory workers
Fictional female domestic workers
Television characters introduced in 1999
Female characters in television